Reno 911! is an American comedy television series created by Robert Ben Garant, Thomas Lennon and Kerri Kenney-Silver for Comedy Central. It is a mockumentary-style parody of law enforcement documentary shows, specifically Cops, with comic actors playing the police officers. Thomas Lennon, Robert Ben Garant, and Kerri Kenney-Silver all starred in and are billed as creators of the series.

The series initially aired from 2003 to 2009 on Comedy Central. A revival of the series premiered on May 4, 2020, on the streaming platform Quibi, which was renewed for an additional season (the show's eighth) on September 3, 2020. Quibi later announced in October 2020 that it would be shutting down while the eighth season was in production. According to Niecy Nash, the eighth season would debut on another platform, which was later revealed to be The Roku Channel. The eighth season, titled Reno 911! Defunded, premiered on February 25, 2022, on The Roku Channel. , the original series is available to watch on Paramount+ and Comedy Central.

Premise
The show is a direct parody of the reality show Cops, which follows actual police officers through their daily duties, such as chasing criminals, and intervening in domestic disputes. Reno 911! features members of the fictitious, massively inept "Reno Sheriff's Department"—distinct from the actual Reno Police Department and Washoe County Sheriff's Office, both of which are absent from the series (although Comedy Central has repeatedly referenced the series as being about the "men and women of the Washoe County Sheriff's Department"). In the course of their duties patrolling both the city of Reno and the rest of Washoe County, Nevada, the deputies sometimes address the camera directly (as though being interviewed for a documentary). The show deals heavily in politically incorrect and racy humor, including many jokes about race, sexual orientation, substance abuse, rape, pedophilia, and mental disorders. Another main comedic aspect of the show is the outlandishly severe incompetence of the deputies—often resulting in their being outsmarted by the criminals they are attempting to control.

Unlike Cops, which the show parodies, Reno 911! Sheriff's deputies are constantly cursing, causing much of their dialogue to be censored for broadcast. The actors often perform their own stunts. A constantly changing cast of weirdos, prostitutes, homeless people, survivalists, political figures, celebrities, etc. are portrayed by comedian friends of the primary cast, and the cast themselves, while disguising their voices and general appearance (and, whose faces were blurred in the style of Cops).

The show's characters occasionally refer to their own program. They insist that the show's producers told them the videotaped footage was going to be used for a Fox Television documentary series titled Heroes on Patrol, and often say in frustration that they have no control over what is aired, and that the show only seems to capture their moments of incompetence. The many "good" incidents, they allege, are left out of the (show-within-a-show's) final edit. Also, some suspects in the show refer to the film crew, and the program being aired on television; occasionally, they will attempt to get arrested just to be on TV.

Development history
In Thomas Lennon's words, Reno 911! came about, "like the best of ideas, through total desperation." Following the end of Viva Variety, The State alumni worked on a series of pilots for the Fox Broadcasting Company, one of which, after a year's worth of dedicated writing, was terminated the day before shooting. It was scheduled to begin in the fall of 2000. With a month left before the pilot was expected to be due (and half of the budget still unused), the team asked if they could produce another pilot with the remaining resources, and the Fox executives agreed. Working quickly to take advantage of this, the initial Reno 911! pilot was conceived and shot in five days. Cedric Yarbrough, who had been hired for the cast of the canceled pilot, said that the cast was advised to "come up with [their] own characters" and return for filming.

As originally written, the sheriff's department material would have served as link material between traditional comedy sketches; the canceled project was being considered for the Fox Saturday lineup, and the team thought at the time that the Cops format was a natural framework for sketch comedy. However, during the shooting—and especially the editing—they realized the police element was more interesting than the sketches, and the finished pilot was, according to Robert Ben Garant, "remarkably similar" to the series that eventually aired. Nevertheless, Fox turned down the completed pilot. According to Lennon, their decision not to pick the show up was influenced by a scene, preserved in the eventual Comedy Central pilot, involving Lt. Dangle passionately kissing a man. It was another two years before Comedy Central greenlit the project.

Production
The establishing shots for the show were filmed in Reno, and everything else was filmed in Los Angeles and Carson, California, with some parts filmed in Oregon. Starting from the fifth season onward, certain segments are also filmed in the small town of Piru, California. The exterior and interior shots of the  Reno Sheriff's Department station were filmed on location at the Los Angeles County Sheriff's Department substation in Carson. Many of the main scenes of the show were shot over the course of many hours, such as the briefing room scenes.  According to the DVD commentary for season three, all morning briefing scenes for a season may be filmed on one 10-hour day with different basic plot elements to be used in different episodes.  Actors would contribute their dialogue as they were inspired to do so.

The show was continued for two additional seasons with Comedy Central running a special of the show titled Reno 911!: Off Duty on March 21, 2004.  The fourth season began on July 9, 2006, and comprised 14 episodes. Comedy Central aired the first seven in the fall of 2006 and the last seven in the spring of 2007. Also in early 2007, a theatrical film based upon the series entitled Reno 911!: Miami was released in North America, featuring the complete TV series cast. The Season Four spring debut drew 1.3 million viewers during the week of March 26 to April 1, 2007. Excess footage from season three was used in season four.

On October 9, 2006, Comedy Central confirmed 13 new episodes to make up Reno 911! Season Five, though the season actually contained 16 episodes. Production of Season Five started in January and wrapped up in April. Reno 911! Season Five premiered on January 16, 2008.  On March 27, 2007, Superstation WGN acquired the first four seasons of the half-hour comedy for a two-year run. The syndicated Reno 911! is a part of their late night comedy block. Reruns are syndicated to broadcast stations. In 2007, Lennon and Garant later appeared in-character on a comedy compilation CD, Comedy Death-Ray, released on September 11, singing a song about why not to use drugs.

On November 10, 2008, Comedy Central confirmed 10 new episodes to make up Reno 911! Season Six, the final season. Principal photography was done between November and December 2008. Carmen Electra was a guest star on an episode filmed December 5, 2008 at Grant High School in Los Angeles. Season Six premiered on April 1, 2009, on Comedy Central. Season Six consisted of fifteen episodes.  Cast members Carlos Alazraqui, Wendi McLendon-Covey, and Mary Birdsong did not return for the final season and their characters' absence was explained as fatalities from an explosion in the Season Five finale. In addition, actors Ian Roberts and Joe Lo Truglio were added to the principal cast as Sergeant Jack Declan and Deputy Frank Salvatore Rizzo, respectively.

On August 13, 2009, Thomas Lennon announced through Twitter that the show had ended its six-year run. In response to the cancellation, residents and officials of Reno, Nevada petitioned to save the show.

Quibi revival
In October 2011, a story broke that the producers of Reno 911! were in negotiations with the internet streaming website Netflix to revive the cancelled Comedy Central series.  The main reason Reno 911!s producers wanted to revive the show was because only 88 episodes were produced, and the producers and syndicating networks would have liked for the show to hit the 100 episode milestone. However, at the time, Comedy Central, who still held sole rights to the show, had not been involved in any negotiations.  As well, Thomas Lennon and Robert Ben Garant were attached to other projects.

It was announced on December 6, 2019, that the series would be revived in 2020 on the streaming platform Quibi. The revival will feature the return of the original series creators Thomas Lennon, Robert Ben Garant and Kerri Kenney-Silver. In a statement, Lennon said: "Reno 911! holds a special place in our hearts, and it will be a delight to get the original cast back together for 're-boot goofin'. Hopefully Nick Swardson can still roller skate. Quibi's short format seems custom made for our show."

Filming of the seventh season started in early 2020, where the production crew was spotted in Piru, California on February 23, 2020. On April 10, 2020, it was announced that a revival of the show set to premiere on May 4, 2020. On September 3, 2020, the show was renewed for an eighth season. On October 23, 2020, it was announced that Quibi would be shutting down. The eighth season, now titled Reno 911! Defunded, made its debut on The Roku Channel on February 25, 2022.

On September 30, 2022, Comedy Central announced the return of the series to its original broadcast network. The eighth season ran on Comedy Central from October 19, 2022, to December 8, 2022.

Episodes

Characters

Season six newcomers Joe Lo Truglio and Ian Roberts had appeared as guest stars in past seasons, and both also appeared in Reno 911: Miami. As a member of The State, Lo Truglio is an old friend of the three creators and has worked with them on numerous projects. Roberts is a founding member of the popular Upright Citizens Brigade improv comedy troupe, who had their own Comedy Central sketch show from 1998 to 2000. Other remaining members of the troupe (Matt Besser and Matt Walsh) also appeared in recurring guest roles throughout the seasons. Amy Poehler is the only member of the "UCB 4" to have never appeared on the show in any form.

Throughout the show's run, all three main cast members from Stella (who were also from The State) made appearances as characters. While Michael Showalter was the exception on the TV series, he appeared in the film, along with all of the cast members of The State.

Main crew members
 Danny DeVito – executive producer
 Michael Shamberg – executive producer
 Stacey Sher – executive producer
 John Landgraf – executive producer
 Peter Principato – executive producer
 Paul Young – executive producer
 Robert Ben Garant – creator
 Kerri Kenney-Silver – creator
 Thomas Lennon – creator
 Michael Patrick Jann – director

Awards and nominations

Films

The series spawned a film released in 2007. In the film, the deputies are called in to save the day after a terrorist attack disrupts a national police convention and locks over 2000 police officers in a hotel in Miami Beach during spring break.

In December 2017, Nash said another film is in the works, but it is unknown if it evolved into anything that came after.

On December 23, 2021, Reno 911! The Hunt for QAnon was released on Paramount+. The film involves the deputies of the Reno Sheriff's Department as they hunt for Q, the one behind all the QAnon conspiracies. Their efforts cause them to get stuck at a QAnon convention at sea.

On October 28, 2022, a third movie was announced to be released on Comedy Central. A Christmas movie titled Reno 911! It's a Wonderful Heist, it premiered December 3, 2022.

Home media

Best of Releases

References

External links

  (original show)
 Official website (2021 revival)
 
 

2000s American LGBT-related comedy television series
2000s American mockumentary television series
2000s American parody television series
2000s American police comedy television series
2003 American television series debuts
2009 American television series endings
2020s American LGBT-related comedy television series
2020s American mockumentary television series
2020s American parody television series
2020s American police comedy television series
2020 American television series debuts
American television series revived after cancellation
Comedy Central original programming
English-language television shows
Reality television series parodies
Television series about television
Television series by MGM Television
Television shows adapted into films
Television shows set in Nevada
Quibi original programming